VfL Wolfsburg II was a German association football team from the city of Wolfsburg, Lower Saxony. It is the reserve team of VfL Wolfsburg. The team's greatest success has been two league championships in the tier four Regionalliga Nord in 2013–14 and 2015–16 which entitled it to take part in the promotion round to the 3. Liga.

The team has also made four appearances in the first round of the German Cup, the DFB-Pokal, in 2001–02, 2002–03, 2003–04 and 2005–06, reaching the second round in 2001–02, after eliminating Borussia Dortmund, and in 2003–04, after eliminating Energie Cottbus in the first.

The team had dissolved at the end of the 2020–21 season.

History
The team first rose above local amateur level when it won promotion to the tier five Verbandsliga Niedersachsen-Ost in 1995, where it played for the next four seasons, then under the name of VfL Wolfsburg Amateure.

Wolfsburg rose above regional Lower Saxony level after winning the tier five Verbandsliga Niedersachsen-Ost in 1998–99. It played the next five seasons in the Oberliga Niedersachsen/Bremen as an upper table side before winning the league in 2003–04 and earning promotion to the Regionalliga Nord for the first time. Relegated from this level after just a single season Wolfsburg entered the Oberliga Nord for two seasons before winning the latter in 2006–07 and returning to the Regionalliga.

In the early 2000s the team made four appearances in the first round of the German Cup, the DFB-Pokal, in 2001–02, 2002–03, 2003–04 and 2005–06. In 2001–02 it eliminated Borussia Dortmund in the first round and, in 2003–04, Energie Cottbus, but was knocked out in the second on both occasions.

The 2007–08 season was the last of the Regionalliga as a tier three league, the 3. Liga having been introduced at the end of season. Despite finishing 19th, the team was allowed to remain in the Regionalliga Nord because of a general league restructuring. Wolfsburg played in the Regionalliga from 2008 onwards, finishing runners-up in 2010, 2011 and 2015 and winning the league in 2014, 2016 and 2019. The latter three entitled the club to participate in the promotion play-offs to the 3. Liga, with the team losing on aggregate to SG Sonnenhof Großaspach in 2014, Regionalliga Bayern champions Jahn Regensburg in 2016 and Regionalliga Bayern champions Bayern Munich II in 2019.

On 10 May 2021, it was announced that the team will be dissolved at the end of the 2020–21 season after failing to achieve promotion to the 3. Liga. The club has stated that it wants to focus on its cooperation with Austrian club St. Pölten to develop its talents instead.

Honours
The club's honours:
 Regionalliga Nord
 Champions: 2013–14, 2015–16, 2018–19
 Runners: 2009–10, 2014–15, 2018–20
 Oberliga Nord
 Champions: 2006–07
 Oberliga Niedersachsen/Bremen
 Champions: 2003–04
 Verbandsliga Niedersachsen-Ost
 Champions: 1998–99
 Lower Saxony Cup
 Winners: 2002, 2003

Recent seasons 
The recent season-by-season performance of the club:

 With the introduction of the 3. Liga in 2008 as the new third tier, below the 2. Bundesliga, all leagues below dropped one tier.

Players

Current squad

References

External links 
Official club site 
VfL Wolfsburg II at Weltfussball.de 

Reserve
German reserve football teams
Lower Saxony reserve football teams
Premier League International Cup